is a quarterly Japanese boys' love (BL) manga magazine. The magazine is published by Akane Shinsha, which launched Opera in 2005 as a successor to its earlier quarterly BL anthology magazine Edge. Notable titles serialized in Opera include Classmates, Go For It, Nakamura!, and the BL works of Natsume Ono.

History
The first issue of Opera was published on December 15, 2005. The magazine is a successor to Edge, Akane Shinsha's previous quarterly BL magazine that ran from May 2004 to April 2005; titles serialized in Opera are published as tankōbon volumes by Akane Shinsha under their Edge Comix imprint. New issues of Opera are published on a quarterly basis.

In 2018, Opera opened a pop-up cafe in Harajuku, Tokyo featuring original merchandise and menu items inspired by titles serialized in the magazine. The cafe operated from March 16 to April 8, 2018. A second pop-up cafe opened in Ikebukuro, Tokyo in 2019.

Serializations

Current
Classmates by Asumiko Nakamura (2006 – present), consisting of:
Dou Kyu Sei (2006 – 2007)
Sotsu Gyo Sei – Winter (2008)
Sotsu Gyo Sei – Spring (2009)
Sora and Hara (2009 – 2011)
O.B. (2012 – 2013)
Blanc (2018 – 2020)
Home (2020 – 2022)
Sajou Rihito no Chichi to Sono Buka (2022 – Current)
Motto Ganbare! Nakamura-kun!! by Syundei (2017 – present)

Former

Kuma to Interi by basso (2005)
Lies are a Gentleman's Manners by Marta Matsuo (2005 – 2010)
 by basso (2005 – 2010), consisting of:
Amato Amaro (2005)
Gad Sfortunato (2007 – 2009)
Al to Neri to Sono Shuuhen (2008 – 2010)
 by basso (2007 – 2011)
 Tokyo Shinjū by Totempole (2008 – 2010)
Senpai by Bikke (2010 – 2011)
Canis by ZAKK (2012 – 2020)
Buchou wa Onee by Nagabe (2013 – 2015)
Go For It, Nakamura! by Syundei  (2014 – 2016)
Itou-san by Sui Kuraka (2014 – 2015)
Total Eclipse of the Eternal Heart by Syundei (2015)
The Wize Wize Beasts of the Wizarding Wizdoms by Nagabe (2015 – 2017)
I: Itou-san 2  by Sui Kuraka (2016 – 2017)
 by Asumiko Nakamura (2017)

Notes

References

External links
 
 

2005 establishments in Japan
Magazines established in 2005
Quarterly manga magazines published in Japan
Yaoi manga magazines